Eoghan ua Cathain (died 980) was Abbot of Clonfert.

There is a gap of sixty-six years between recorded abbots, rendering the exact succession between Aedh and Eoghan uncertain.

References

 Annals of Ulster at CELT: Corpus of Electronic Texts at University College Cork
 Annals of Tigernach at CELT: Corpus of Electronic Texts at University College Cork
Revised edition of McCarthy's synchronisms at Trinity College Dublin.
 MacLysaght, Edward, The Surnames of Ireland, 1978
 Byrne, Francis John (2001), Irish Kings and High-Kings, Dublin: Four Courts Press, 

Christian clergy from County Galway
10th-century Irish abbots
980 deaths
Year of birth unknown